Cobitis elongata (Balkan loach) is a species of ray-finned fish in the family Cobitidae.
It is found in Austria, Bosnia and Herzegovina, Bulgaria, Croatia, Hungary, Romania, Serbia and Montenegro, Slovenia, and Turkey.

In the most recent (2008) assessment, the IUCN Red List of Threatened Species lists the Balkan loach's status as "least concern".

Sources

External links 
 

Cobitis
Freshwater fish of Europe
Fish described in 1858
Taxonomy articles created by Polbot